The 1989–90 season was Swindon Town's third season in the Division Two since their promotion from the third tier of English football in 1987. Alongside the league campaign, Swindon Town also competed in the FA Cup, League Cup and the Full Members Cup.

Second Division

Second Division play-offs

The semifinals were decided over two legs. The final consisted of only a single match.The full results can be found at: Football League Division Two play-offs 1990.

Results and Line-Ups

Division Two 

1 1st Substitution, 2 2nd Substitution.

Division Two play-offs 

1 1st Substitution, 2 2nd Substitution.

FA Cup 

1 1st Substitution, 2 2nd Substitution.

League Cup 

1 1st Substitution, 2 2nd Substitution.

Full Members Cup 

1 1st Substitution, 2 2nd Substitution.

References 

Swindon Town F.C. seasons
Swindon Town F.C.